Medium Raw may refer to:

 Medium Raw (book), a book by Anthony Bourdain
 Medium Raw: Night of the Wolf, a film written and directed by Andrew Cymek

See also 
 Medium rare